Pseudepilysta loebli is a species of beetle in the family Cerambycidae, and the only species in the genus Pseudepilysta. It was described by Hüdepohl in 1996.

References

Apomecynini
Beetles described in 1996
Monotypic beetle genera